This is a list of women photographers who were born in Norway or whose works are closely associated with that country.

A
Louise Abel (1841–1907), German-born photographer, together with her husband Hans Abel opened a studio in Oslo in 1864

B
Bolette Berg (1872–1944), studio portrait photographer
Hulda Marie Bentzen (1858–1930), professional photographer, established studios in Bergen and Voss
Marie Magdalene Bull (1827–1907), actress and photographer

C
Catherine Cameron (born 1962), artistic photographer

F
Karoline Frogner (born 1961), filmmaker, photographer, writer, educator
Mimi Frellsen (1830–1914), pioneering female photographer in Oslo

G
Anne Helene Gjelstad (born 1956), photographer, fashion designer

H
Elisabeth Helmer (1854 – after 1912), professional photographer in Grimstad
Marie Høeg (1866–1949), photographer, suffragist
Tina Signesdottir Hult (born 1982), portrait photographer

K
Anne Krafft (born 1957), painter, ceramist, photographer

L
Kristin Lodoen Linder (born 1966), photographer, visual artist, dancer, choreographer
Marthine Lund (c.1817 – 1870), early female photographer, studio in Christiania from 1865

M
Elisabeth Meyer (1899–1968), photographer, journalist
Mimsy Møller (born 1955), press photographer
Hanneli Mustaparta (born 1982), photographer, fashion blogger, former model

N
Agnes Nyblin (1869–1945), professional photographer, ran a studio in Bergen

S
Johanna Ullricka Bergstrøm Skagen (1839–1882), Swedish-born Norwegian professional photographer 
Augusta Solberg (1856–1922), professional photographer, studio in Bergen

T
Marie Thomsen (c.1814 – after 1889), pioneering photographer in Christiania from 1859.

See also
List of women photographers

-
Norwegian women photographers, List of
Photographers, List of Norwegian
Photographers